Huanghuachang is a village in Huanghua, Yiling, Yichang, Hubei, China.

An outcrop of sedimentary rock from the Ordovician has made Huanghuachang famous in the earth science community. The "Huanghuachang section" is an outcrop of the Dawan Formation in which the official base of the Dapingian stage is defined. (Daping is a settlement near to Huanghuachang).

References

 
Geography of Yichang
Village-level divisions of Hubei